This is a chronological list of South Africa Test wicket-keepers.

References
 South Africa wicket-keepers

Wicket-keepers, Test
South African
South African
Wicket-keepers